Gianni Beschin (15 February 1953 – 12 February 2021) was an Italian football referee.

Biography
In 1989, he won the Giorgio Bernardi Award, given to a promising young official in Serie A. In 1992, he was awarded the Giovanni Mauro Prize, the highest award he would receive in his career.

However, his career slowly declined after 1995, with two one-month-long suspensions during the 1996–97 season, both for violating strict AIA policy on bringing a significant other to a match. He resigned in May 1997. He was a manager for Cosenza Calcio from 1998 to 2001 and for S.P.A.L. in 2002.

Gianni Beschin died following a sudden illness in Corigliano-Rossano on 12 February 2021, at the age of 67, three days short from his 68th birthday.

References

1953 births
2021 deaths
Sportspeople from the Province of Verona
Italian football referees